Joshua Bredl (born January 28, 1991) is an American former professional wrestler best known for his time in WWE under the name Bronson Matthews. In 2015, Bredl was the male winner of the sixth season of the WWE competition Tough Enough, earning a one-year contract with the promotion.

Early life and football career 
Bredl was born in Thornton, Colorado, and has a younger sister named Brandi Bredl. He attended Horizon High School. He has a background in college football, playing defensive end and defensive tackle for the ThunderWolves at Colorado State University–Pueblo, and also majored in exercise science. He also played low post in basketball for the Colorado Hawks. He tried out for the Denver Broncos in April 2015. Bredl was a fan of professional wrestling whilst growing up, and cited Stone Cold Steve Austin as his favorite wrestler.

Professional wrestling career

WWE (2015–2017) 
In June 2015, Bredl was announced as one of the thirteen finalists for the sixth season of the WWE competition Tough Enough. After being at risk of elimination three times throughout the course of the competition, on August 25, Bredl was chosen by fan vote as one of the winners, along with Sara Lee, earning a $250,000 one-year contract with WWE. During the final, Bredl adopted the ring name The Yeti, and lost a singles match to Cesaro. In September, Bredl was assigned to WWE's developmental territory NXT, based at the WWE Performance Center in Orlando, Florida, to begin training. At an NXT live event on December 3, 2015, Bredl made his first appearance for NXT, where he revealed that his new ring name was Bronson Matthews. 

In January 2016, Bredl made a tweet referring to the lower-card stable The Social Outcasts as "Social Jobbers". This would cause backstage backlash from WWE wrestlers, including Cody Rhodes and Kevin Owens. Bredl was then temporarily banned from NXT locker rooms as a result. Bredl wrestled his final match on July 7, 2016; he was released from his WWE contract on November 5, 2017.

Personal life 
Bredl has two children with his wife, Lydia.

Championships and accomplishments 
 WWE
 Tough Enough VI – with Sara Lee

References

External links 
 
 CSU–Pueblo ThunderWolves football bio

1991 births
21st-century professional wrestlers
American male professional wrestlers
Colorado State University alumni
Living people
People from Thornton, Colorado
Professional wrestlers from Colorado
Tough Enough winners